Çarçovë (also Çarshovë;  Tsartsova or Κεράσοβο/Kerasovo) is a village, a municipal unit and a former municipality in the Gjirokastër County, southern Albania.

Demographics 
The population of the former municipality at the 2011 census was 918. The total number of registered citizens of Çarçovë is 2.969 as of 2019. At the 2015 local government reform it became a subdivision of the municipality Përmet. The municipal unit consists of the villages Çarçovë, Vllaho-Psilloterë, Biovizhdë, Zhepë, Draçovë, Iliar-Munushtir, Strëmbec, Pëllumbar and Kanikol. The town of Çarçovë also has Greek and Aromanian communities. Two villages in the former municipality of Çarçovë are predominantly Greek speaking, in particular:  Biovizhdë and Vllaho-Psilloterë. In Biovizhdë there is a significant Aromanian minority population. Their presence was originally temporary, related to their transhumant lifestyle, before becoming permanent in the village. According to a 2014 report by the Albanian government, there were 245 ethnic Greeks in Vllaho-Psillotere and 200 in Biovizhde in the total number of registered citizens. Some Biovizhdë Aromanians have migrated to Albanian cities. In Vllaho-Psilloterë, three Muslim Albanian families used to live there with a single member from one family still remaining in the early 2010s.  Some Greek speakers also exist in the nearby villages of Zhepë and Draçovë.  The destroyed village of Mesarë located on the Albanian-Greek border was inhabited by Muslim Albanians.

Notable people 
Hasan Tahsin Pasha, An Albanian Pasha from the now ruined village of Mesarë.

References

Administrative units of Përmet
Aromanian settlements in Albania
Former municipalities in Gjirokastër County
Greek communities in Albania
Villages in Gjirokastër County